Curtis Delroy Stevens (born March 10, 1985) is an American former professional boxer. Stevens challenged for the WBA and IBO middleweight titles in 2013.

Background
Born and raised by a single mother in Brownsville, Stevens began boxing at the age of five, later having his first amateur bout at the age of eight. He was trained by his uncle and Andre Rozier. Stevens holds the record for the third most knockouts in New York's amateur history. Early on in his career, Stevens was managed by Chris Gotti, before later joining with Lou DiBella.

Professional career
Stevens made his professional debut on September 30, 2004, stopping Henry Dukes in the first round. He would remain undefeated over his next twelve fights until a loss to Marcos Primera, who stopped him in the eighth and final round on July 20, 2006. In a rematch against Primera later that year on November 15, Stevens avenged the loss with an eight-round unanimous decision (UD). A second loss came against Andre Dirrell on July 16, 2007, via ten-round UD.

On November 2, 2013, Stevens received his first world title opportunity when he faced WBA and IBO middleweight champion Gennady Golovkin. In what was an anticipated match-up between two formidable knockout artists, Stevens was knocked down in round two, and despite occasionally landing some hard shots on Golovkin thereafter, Stevens retired in his corner by the end of round eight.

Stevens was matched up against another fellow knockout artist, David Lemieux, on March 11, 2017. As was predicted, their fight immediately broke down into an all-out slugfest, but it was Lemieux who scored a brutal one-punch knockout in round three. Stevens was taken out of the ring in a stretcher and hospitalized overnight.

In his next fight, Stevens fought Carlos Jairo Cruz in Santiago de los Caballeros, Dominican Republic. Stevens stopped his opponent at the end of the fourth round and secured the win. However, his win was overshadowed by the home crowd which charged in the ring right after the announcement, attacking Stevens and his team, who managed to escape to the dressing room.

In his following fight, Stevens fought Wale Omotoso, his first fight after stepping down to 154 pounds. The change in weight didn't seem to help Stevens much, who got dropped three times and stopped by Omotoso. Stevens managed to beat the count of the last knockdown, but did not look steady on his feet, which prompted the referee to end the fight.

Professional boxing record

Big Knockout Boxing record

References

External links

Curtis Stevens - Profile, News Archive & Current Rankings at Box.Live

1985 births
Living people
Boxers from New York City
Light-heavyweight boxers
Winners of the United States Championship for amateur boxers
Sportspeople from Brooklyn
American male boxers
Middleweight boxers
Super-middleweight boxers